The El Mamey Formation is a geologic formation in the Dominican Republic. The formation consists of shales and sandstones interspersed with a conglomerate of well-rounded pebbles, deposited in a fluvio-deltaic environment. El Mamey Formation is one of the formations containing Dominican amber and preserves fossils dating back to the Burdigalian to Langhian period.

Fossil content 

 Palaeoraphe dominicana
 Roystonea palaea
 Sphaerodactylus ciguapa, S. dommeli
 Trithrinax dominicana
 Eleutherodactylus sp.
 Chilopoda indet.
 Diptera indet.

See also 

 List of fossiliferous stratigraphic units in the Dominican Republic
 La Toca Formation
 Baitoa Formation
 Cercado Formation

References

Further reading 
 G. O. Poinar, Jr. and D. C. Canatella. 1987. An upper Eocene frog from the Dominican Republic and its implication for Caribbean biogeography. Science 237:1215-1216

Geologic formations of the Dominican Republic
Neogene Dominican Republic
Burdigalian
Langhian
Shale formations
Sandstone formations
Conglomerate formations
Deltaic deposits
Fluvial deposits
Paleontology in the Dominican Republic
Formations